Thomas Cartter Lupton (1899–1977) was an American businessman.

Biography

Early life
He was the only child of John Thomas Lupton, founder of the Dixie Coca-Cola Bottling Company, and Elizabeth Patten.

Philanthropy
A philanthropist, he founded the Lyndhurst Foundation, formerly known as The Memorial Welfare Foundation. The Lupton Library at the University of Tennessee at Chattanooga is named for him and his wife.

Personal life
He was married to Margaret Rawlings Lupton. They had a son, John T. Lupton II. They lived in Chattanooga, Tennessee. Unlike his father or son, he was known for being a recluse. The neighborhood Lupton City is named after him.  

At the time of his death, his $200 million (USD) estate was the largest ever probated in the South.

References

External links
 The Lyndhurst Foundation

1899 births
1977 deaths
American drink industry businesspeople
Coca-Cola people
People from Chattanooga, Tennessee